A tibial plateau fracture is a break of the upper part of the tibia (shinbone) that involves the knee joint. Symptoms include pain, swelling, and a decreased ability to move the knee. People are generally unable to walk. Complication may include injury to the artery or nerve, arthritis, and compartment syndrome.

The cause is typically trauma such as a fall or motor vehicle collision. Risk factors include osteoporosis and certain sports such as skiing. Diagnosis is typically suspected based on symptoms and confirmed with X-rays and a CT scan. Some fractures may not be seen on plain X-rays.

Pain may be managed with NSAIDs, opioids, and splinting. In those who are otherwise healthy, treatment is generally by surgery. Occasionally, if the bones are well aligned and the ligaments of the knee are intact, people may be treated without surgery.

They represent about 1% of broken bones. They occur most commonly in middle aged males and older females. In the 1920s they were called a "fender fracture" due to their association with people being hit by a motor vehicle while walking.

Signs and symptoms 
Tibial plateau fractures typically presents with knee effusion, swelling of the knee or fragmentation of the tibia which leads to loss of its normal structural appearance. Blood in the soft tissues and knee joint (hemarthrosis) may lead to bruising and a doughy feel of the knee joint. Due to the tibial plateau's proximity to important vascular (i.e. arteries, veins) and neurological (i.e. nerves such as peroneal and tibial) structures, injuries to these may occur upon fracture. A careful examination of the neurovascular systems is imperative. A serious complication of tibial plateau fractures is compartment syndrome in which swelling causes compression of the nerves and blood vessels inside the leg and may ultimately lead to  necrosis or cell death of the leg tissues.

Cause 
Tibial plateau fractures may be divided into low energy or high energy fractures. Low energy fractures are commonly seen in older females due to osteoporotic bone changes and are typically depressed fractures. High energy fractures are commonly the result of motor vehicle accidents, falls or sports related injuries. These causes constitute the majority of tibial plateau fractures in young individuals.

Mechanism 
Fractures of the tibial plateau are caused by a varus (inwardly angulating) or valgus (outwardly angulating) force combined with axial loading or weight bearing on knee. The classically described situation in which this occurs is from a car striking a pedestrian's fixed knee ("bumper fracture"). However, most of these fractures occur from motor vehicle accidents or falls. Injury can be due to a fall from height in which knee forced into valgus or varus. The tibial condyle is crushed or split by the opposing femoral condyle, which remains intact.
The knee anatomy provides insight into predicting why certain fracture patterns occur more often than others. The medial plateau is larger and significantly stronger than the lateral plateau. Also, there is a natural valgus or outward angulation alignment to the limb which coupled with the often valgus or outwardly angulating force on impact will injure the lateral side. This explains how 60% of plateau fractures involve the lateral plateau, 15% medial plateau, 25% bicondylar lesions. Partial or complete ligamentous ruptures occur in 15-45%, meniscal lesions in about 5-37% of all tibial plateau fractures.

Diagnosis 
In all injuries to the tibial plateau  radiographs (commonly called x-rays) are imperative. Computed tomography scans are not always necessary but are sometimes critical for evaluating degree of fracture and determining a treatment plan that would not be possible with plain radiographs. Magnetic Resonance images are the diagnostic modality of choice when meniscal, ligamentous and soft tissue injuries are suspected. CT angiography should be considered if there is alteration of the distal pulses or concern about arterial injury.

Classification 
Physicians use classification types to assess the degree of injury, treatment plan and predict prognosis. Multiple classifications of tibial plateau fractures have been developed. Currently, the Schatzker classification system is the most widely accepted and used. It is composed of six condyle fracture types classified by fracture pattern and fragment anatomy. Each increasing numeric fracture type denotes increasing severity. The severity correlates with the amount of energy imparted to the bone at the time of injury and prognosis.

Schatzker classification for tibial plateau fracture:
 Type I =  Lateral Tibial plateau fracture without depression.
This is a wedge-shaped pure cleavage fracture and  involves a vertical split of the lateral tibial plateau. It is usually the result of a low energy injury in young individuals with normal mineralization. May be caused by a valgus force combined with axial loading that leads to the lateral femoral condyle being driven into the articular surface of the tibial plateau. Represent 6% of all tibial plateau fractures.
 Type II =  Lateral tibial plateau fracture with depression,
This is a combined cleavage and compression fracture and involves vertical split of the lateral condyle combined with depression of the adjacent load bearing part of the condyle. Caused by a valgus force on the knee; it is a low energy injury, typically seen in individuals of the 4th decade or older with osteoporotic changes in bone. Most common, and make up 75% of all tibial plateau fractures. There is a 20% risk of distraction injuries to the medial collateral ligament.  May include distraction injury to the medial collateral ligament or anterior cruciate ligament.

 Type III:  Focal depression of articular surface with no associated split.
This is a pure compression fracture of the lateral or central tibial plateau in which the articular surface of the tibial plateau is depressed and driven into the lateral tibial metaphysis by axial forces.3  A low energy injury, these fractures are more frequent in the 4th and 5th decades of life and individuals with osteoporotic changes in bone.  They are extremely rare.
Can be further divided into two subtypes:
IIIA Compression Fracture of the lateral tibial plateau
IIIB Compression Fracture of the central tibial plateau
May result in joint instability.
 Type IV = Medial tibial plateau fracture, with or without depression; may involve tibial spines; associated soft tissue injuries.
This is a medial tibial plateau fracture with a split or depressed component. It is usually the result of a high energy injury and involves a varus force with axial loading at the knee.  Represent 10% of all tibial plateau fractures. There is high risk of damage to the popliteal artery and peroneal nerve and therefore carry a worse prognosis. May include distraction injuries to lateral collateral ligament, fibular dislocation/fracture, posterolateral corner.
 Type V = Bicondylar tibial plateau fracture,
Consists of a split fracture of the medial and lateral tibial plateau. It is usually the result of a high energy injury with complex varus and valgus forces acting upon the tibial plateau. May include injuries to the anterior cruciate ligament and collateral ligaments. Make up 3% of all tibial plateau fractures.
 Type VI = Tibial plateau fracture with diaphyseal discontinuity
Main feature of this type of fracture is a transverse subcondylar fracture with dissociation of the metaphysis from the diaphysis. The fracture pattern of the condyles is variable and all types of fractures can occur. This is a high energy injury with a complex mechanism that includes varus and valgus forces. Up to 33% of these fractures may be open, often with extensive soft tissue injuries and risk of compartment syndrome. Represents 20% of all tibial plateau fractures.

Treatment 

Pain may be managed with NSAIDs, opioids, and splinting. In those who are otherwise healthy, treatment is generally by surgery. Occasionally, if the bones are well aligned and the ligaments of the knee are intact, people may be treated without surgery.
The surgery usually involves reducing the fractured fragments of the tibia plateau to their anatomical position and fixing them in place with screws only or fixed angle anatomical plates ensuring absolute stability. Implant selection is based on the type of injury. Generally, simple or incomplete fractures (Schatzker type 1) of the plateau are compressed with 6.5mm partially threaded cancellous screws. Complex type fractures will require a plate for enhanced stability. As the tibia condyles articulate with the femur (thigh bone) to form knee joint, any incongruity in the articular surface is unacceptable as it leads to early arthritis. Prolonged immobilization of the knee joint is also not recommended which result in stiffness of the joint and difficult recovery.

Epidemiology 
Tibial plateau fractures constitute 1% of all fractures. Peak age is 30–40 years old in men and 60–70 in women.  Approximately half of the people who sustain a tibial plateau fracture are aged over 50 years old.

References

External links

Bone fractures
Knee injuries
Wikipedia medicine articles ready to translate